"Santa Lucia" is a traditional Neapolitan song. It was translated by Teodoro Cottrau (1827–1879) into Italian and published by the Cottrau firm, as a barcarola, in Naples in 1849. Cottrau translated it from Neapolitan into Italian during the first stage of the Italian unification, the first Neapolitan song to be given Italian lyrics. Its transcriber, who is very often credited as its composer, was the son of the French-born Italian composer and collector of songs Guillaume Louis Cottrau (1797–1847). Various sources credit A. Longo with the music, 1835.

The original lyrics of "Santa Lucia" celebrate the picturesque waterfront district, Borgo Santa Lucia, in the Gulf of Naples, in the invitation of a boatman to take a turn in his boat, to better enjoy the cool of the evening.

Lyrics

Neapolitan lyrics
Comme se frícceca
la luna chiena!
lo mare ride,
ll'aria è serena...
È pronta e lesta
la varca mia...
Santa Lucia,
Santa Lucia!

Stu viento frisco
fa risciatare:
chi vo' spassarse
jenno pe' mmare?
Vuje che facite
'mmiezo a la via?
Santa Lucia,
Santa Lucia!

La tènna è posta
pe' fa' 'na cena;
e quanno stace
la panza chiena
non c'è la mínema
melanconia.
Santa Lucia,
Santa Lucia!

 The following two lines were included in the Neapolitan version as transcribed in the "Italia Mia" website.
Pozzo accostare la varca mia
Santa Lucia, Santa Lucia!

Italian lyrics

English lyrics
Now 'neath the silver moon Ocean is glowing,
O'er the calm billows, soft winds are blowing.
Here balmy breezes blow, pure joys invite us,
And as we gently row, all things delight us.

Chorus:
Hark, how the sailor's cry joyously echoes nigh:
Santa Lucia, Santa Lucia!
Home of fair Poesy, realm of pure harmony,
Santa Lucia, Santa Lucia!

When o'er the waters light winds are playing,
Thy spell can soothe us, all care allaying.
To thee sweet Napoli, what charms are given,
Where smiles creation, toil blest by heaven.

Versions 
Perhaps the definitive 20th century recording of the song was that of Enrico Caruso, the great Neapolitan opera singer. Mario Lanza recorded this song in this album "Mario Lanza sings Caruso favorites", RCA Victor LSC-2393.

In the United States, an early edition of the song, with an English translation by Thomas Oliphant, was published by M. McCaffrey, Baltimore.

In Sweden, Finland, Denmark, the Faroe Islands, and Norway, "Santa Lucia" has been given various lyrics to accommodate it to the winter-light Saint Lucy's Day, at the darkest time of the year. The three most famous lyrics versions in Swedish are Luciasången, also known by its incipit, Sankta Lucia, ljusklara hägring ("Saint Lucy, bright illusion"); Natten går tunga fjät ("The night walks with heavy steps"); and the 1970s "kindergarten" version, Ute är mörkt och kallt ("Outside it’s dark and cold"). The more common Norwegian version is Svart senker natten seg ("Black the night descends"), whereas the version commonly used in Denmark is titled Nu bæres lyset frem ("Now light is carried forth").

In the Czech Republic (or former Czechoslovakia), it was made famous with the words Krásná je Neapol sung by Waldemar Matuška.

In Austria it is famous under the title "Wenn sich der Abend mild". It is sung by Austrian fraternities.

In Thailand a translation, Silpakorn Niyom, is the anthem of Silpakorn University; the founder of the university, Silpa Bhirasri, was Italian.

Performances
 A choir sings in Swedish in Arthur's Perfect Christmas.
 Bing Crosby included the song in a medley on his album 101 Gang Songs (1961).
 Elvis Presley recorded the song on the 1965 album Elvis for Everyone! It was featured in his film Viva Las Vegas.
 Monsieur Tranquille made a disco version for his 1977 debut album Monsieur Tranquille – Faut pas m'chercher
Tolmachevy Sisters performed it as the closing track to their 2007 debut album Polovinki and as well as on the VGTRK TV series Subbotniy Vecher in 2006.
Italian tenor Sergio Franchi (1926–1990) recorded this song in 1963 on his RCA Victor Red Seal album, Our Man From Italy.
Hayley Westenra included the song in her album Treasure.
 In 1964, Jim Nabors, Don Knotts, Andy Griffith, and the choir performed the song on The Andy Griffith Show, in the episode "The Song Festers".
 Italian-American crooner Jerry Vale recorded a popular version of the song.
 Tom and Jerry sang it at the beginning of the cartoon Cat and Dupli-cat.
 Mustafa Sağyaşar recorded a version in Turkish in 1998, with his son Cemil.
 Robot B-9 sang several verses in the "Lost in Space" episode, "The Ghost Planet." Although normally voiced by well-known actor and voice-over expert Dick Tufeld, this version was sung by Bob May, the actor who played the Robot. It was one of the rare times May's voice was heard instead of Tufeld's. May was accompanied by actor Bill Mumy (who played Will Robinson), on the guitar. Mumy already was an accomplished musician and went on to a career in acting and music.

References

External links
 "Santa Lucia" sung by Enrico Caruso
 "Santa Lucia" free Sheet Music for piano
 Choral Public Domain Library

1849 songs
Christmas carols
Neapolitan songs
Italian folk songs
Elvis Presley songs
Songs about Naples